From Detroit to J.A. is The Kleptones' third album, which blends R&B instrumentals with Pop, Rap, and R&B vocals.

The mashups were initially created for The Rinse radio show (on the London station XFM). It was originally broadcast on 23 January 2005, and later released as an internet-only album.

Track listing
 "Fox Intro" – 2:07
 Samples - 20th Century Fox, Intro Music
 Samples - Counter-Strike
 "Ok, let's go."
 Samples - The Cars - Hello Again (The Cars song)
 "Hello...Hello Again."
 "Let's Get The Dirt" – 4:51
 Samples - Marvin Gaye - Let's Get It On
 Samples - Peter Gabriel - Digging in the Dirt
 "What Is... ?" – 1:29
 Samples - Cypress Hill - I want to get high / Hits from the Bong
 "Keep Love Right" – 3:55
 Samples - Marvin Gaye - Running from Love (Version 2 w/Strings)
 Samples - Erykah Badu - On and On
 "Topknot Tears" – 4:10
 Samples - Cornershop - Topknot
 Samples - Smokey Robinson and the Miracles - Baby, Baby Don't Cry
 Sound bites - Jason Lee as Brodie Bruce in Mallrats ("Jesus Christ man there are just some things...")
 Sound bites - Macaulay Culkin in the video for Michael Jackson's Black or White ("But Dad, this is the best part")
 "Caught out Nightclubbing" – 4:51
 Samples - Shaggy featuring Ricardo Ducent - It Wasn't Me
 Samples - Smokey Robinson and the Miracles - The Tracks of My Tears
 Samples - Kelis - Caught out There
 Samples - Tears for Fears - Shout
 "Jayout" – 1:21
 Samples - Jurassic 5 - Jayou
 Samples - Tears for Fears - Shout
 "I Want An Affair" – 4:20
 Samples - Marvin Gaye - I Want You
 Samples - Mary J. Blige - Family Affair
 "Running From Da Squeeze" – 2:18
 Samples - Gangstarr - Tha Squeeze
 Samples - Marvin Gaye - Mandota
 "Waking Groove" – 0:58
 Sound bites - Waking Life
 Samples - MARRS - Pump Up the Volume
 "Bowified Rebelution" – 3:38
 Samples - Jurassic 5 - Unified Rebellion
 Samples - David Bowie - Fame
 Samples - Eddie Kendricks - Keep on Truckin'
 Samples - Eric B. & Rakim - Paid in Full (Coldcut Remix)
 "Mandota Drop" – 3:28
 Samples - Marvin Gaye - Running from Love (Version 1)
 Samples - Snoop Dogg featuring Pharrell - Drop It Like It's Hot
 "Words Of Wisdom" – 0:22
 Sound bites - Ol' Dirty Bastard
 "Juxtaposed With Riddim" – 2:53
 Samples - Super Furry Animals - Juxtaposed With U
 Samples - Seeed - Shake Baby Shake
 "Interview 1" – 0:23
 Samples - Monty Python's Flying Circus - Fish Licence sketch
 "Take it away Eric the orchestra leader."
 "Close To My Girl" – 3:18
 Samples - The Temptations - My Girl
 Samples - T.O.K - Shining Star (The beat of Shining Star is essentially the same as The Cure's Close to Me.)
 "Interview 2" – 1:20
 Sound bites - Jason Mewes as Jay - ("OK Lunchbox, let's try this again")
 "Dancin' Papa" – 5:39
 Samples - The Temptations - Papa Was a Rolling Stone
 Samples - David Bowie - Let's Dance
 Samples - Run–D.M.C. 
 "Really Rappin' Something" – 2:50
 Samples - Velvelettes - Really Saying Something
 Samples - Chicks on Speed - Wordy Rappinghood
 "Revolverlution" – 5:41
 Samples - Michael Jackson - Ben
 Samples - Smoove - The Revolution Will Be Televised
 Sound bites - Keanu Reeves as Neo in The Matrix

External links
 From Detroit to J.A. download page

The Kleptones albums
2006 remix albums
Motown